"Every Little Thing" is a song from New Zealand singer Margaret Urlich. The song was released in August 1995 as the second single from her third studio album, The Deepest Blue. The song peaked at number 50 in Australia.

Track listing 
CD single
 "Every Little Thing" – 3:15
 "Fly with You"

Charts

References 

1995 songs
1995 singles
Margaret Urlich songs
Columbia Records singles
Songs written by Margaret Urlich
Songs written by Robyn Smith (record producer)